Pueblo chico, infierno grande (English: Small town, big hell) is a Mexican historical telenovela set in the Pre-Mexican Revolution period, produced by José Alberto Castro for Televisa in 1997. From Monday, January 6, 1997 until Friday, August 1, 1997, Canal de las Estrellas broadcast it weekdays at 10:00pm, replacing Te sigo amando and replaced by Salud, dinero y amor.  Televisa released an abridged DVD version of the novela in several countries. It also aired on Univisión in the United States.

Verónica Castro, Juan Soler and Guillermo Capetillo starred as protagonists, while Alma Delfina, Salvador Sánchez, Mónika Sánchez and Adalberto Parra as the main antagonists.

Background
Pueblo chico, infierno grande is a colloquial expression in Spanish, translated as "small town, big hell".

It is also the title of a 1926 Chilean movie directed by Nicanor de la Sotta, starring  Ernestina Estay, Evaristo Lillo and Plácido Martín 

It is also a 1941 Argentinian movie by Orestes Caviglia, written by Henri Martinent and Eduardo Pappo, shot in Argentina with cinematography by Roque Funes, starring Arturo Bamio, Lucía Barause and Nélida Bilbao with music by Alejandro Gutiérrez del Barrio.

Plot
Pueblo chico, infierno grande takes place in Nahuatzen, a small town in the Sierra Purépecha in Michoacán, Mexico, in early 1900. The young girl Leonarda Ruán (Aracely Arámbula), is the youngest daughter of the venerable Don Prisciliano Ruan (Enrique Rocha).

The day of the feast of the town's patron saint, Saint Louis of France, Leonarda discovers her feelings for Hermilo Jaimes (Kuno Becker), a poor boy who works in a grocery store. But that afternoon, the old Don Rosendo Equigua (Jorge Russek) the richest man in Nahuatzen, sets his eyes on the girl.

Don Prisciliano disapproves of the love between Leonarda and Hermilo, and yields the girl's hand to Rosendo. That same afternoon, a girl named Magdalena Beltran (Evangelina Sosa), falls for a young man nicknamed "El Batan" (Jose Maria Yazpik). Her mother, Inmaculada (Socorro Bonilla), is surprised that she feels lust for "El Batan".

Leonarda is forced to marry Rosendo. Hermilo leaves town, but swears he will be very powerful one day and return for her. Meanwhile, Magdalena discovers her mother in bed with "El Batan". She wanders the streets and falls into perdition in the whorehouse from "La Tapanca" (Lilia Aragón).

A few months after his marriage with Leonarda, Rosendo dies. At 16 years, Leonarda is a widow and Nahuatzen's richest woman, but she vows to wait for Hermilo.... 20 years go by, and Leonarda (Verónica Castro), returns from a long trip through Europe. On her return, while hanging around her properties she meets a handsome 20 year old young man named Genaro (Juan Soler).

Genaro and Leonarda feel a strong attraction for each other, and Leonarda lets him work on her farm. Throughout the town, women feel fascination for Genaro's striking resemblance with St. Louis. Some of the girls are Indalecia (Mónika Sánchez), an evil Indian, Leonarda's servant and Braulia Felicitas (Karyme Lozano), a rich girl from the region. But Genaro only has eyes for Leonarda, and both end up confessing their love.

The whole town is shocked by their relationship. Genaro is 16 years younger than Leonarda and could be her son. Meanwhile, Magdalena (Alma Delfina) now calls herself "La Beltraneja" and leads the whorehouse of "La Tapanca". Beltraneja and La tapanca has a faithful servant, "Odilón" (Hernán Del Riego)One night when Genaro and Leonarda argue, he visits the home of La Beltraneja, and drunk, asks her to marry him, sparking an obsession in the woman.

The evil Sheriff of Nahuatzen, Consejo Serratos (Salvador Sánchez), loves Leonarda and despises Genaro. The situation is further complicated when Hermilo Jaimes (Guillermo Capetillo) returning, now a rich gentleman. Leonarda reluctantly confesses Hermilo her new feelings. He decides to wait.

Leonarda refuses to marry Genaro, because she is sterile and can never bear children. The Puritan Leonarda's sisters, Cleotilde (Anna Silvetti), Eloísa (Olivia Bucio) and Jovita (Silvia Manríquez), are the main judges. Characters like the Father Arceo (Luis Gimeno), the healer Martina "La Perra" (Patricia Reyes Spíndola) the Nanny Maclovia (Angelina Peláez), Don Arcadio (José Carlos Ruiz) and Miss Gildarda (Beatriz Cecilia) are allies.

When La Beltraneja finds out above the love between Genaro and Leonarda, she becomes very jealous. Braulia and Indalecia are also in love with Genaro. Leonarda has to endure the calumnies of the people and fight for her love for Genaro.

Aside from the main story, there are stories of other villagers like the sisters Porfiria and Rutila Cumbios (Rosa Maria Bianchi and Ana Bertha Espín), Miss Gildard Zavala and her mother Mrs. Hipolita (Alicia Montoya), Leonarda's sisters, and Leonarda's nephews, Priscilla (Ana de la Reguera) and Baldo (Germán Gutiérrez), who are in love despite being first cousins, so a Little town, becomes a Big hell...

Cast 

 Verónica Castro as Leonarda Ruán
 Aracely Arámbula as Young Leonarda Ruán
 Guillermo Capetillo as Hermilo Jaimez 
 Alma Delfina as Magdalena
 Juan Soler as Génaro Onchi 
 Luis Gimeno as Padre Arceo
 Jorge Martínez de Hoyos as Chucho Ríos
 Alicia Montoya as Doña Hipólita
 José Carlos Ruiz as Arcadio
 Salvador Sánchez as Consejo Serratos
 Lilia Aragón as La Tapanca
 Patricia Reyes Spíndola as Martina
 Anna Silvetti as Cleotilde
 Rosa María Bianchi as Porfiria Cumbios
 Olivia Bucio as Eloísa
 Angelina Peláez as Maclovia
 Ana Bertha Espín as Rutilia Cumbios
 Evangelina Martínez as Saturnina
 Monserrat Ontiveros as Melitona
 Luis Xavier as Antonio Serna
 Óscar Traven as Gumaro
 Mónika Sánchez as Indalecia
 Karyme Lozano as Braulia
 Orlando Miguel as Palemón Morales
 Juan Ignacio Aranda as Baldomero
 Germán Gutiérrez as Baldomero's son
 Beatriz Cecilia as Gildarda Zavala
 Theo Tapia as Estanislao Allende
 Adalberto Parra as Guadalupe Tiburcio
 Silvia Manríquez as Jovita 
 Lourdes Deschamps as Cayetana
 José Maria Yazpik as Batán
 Hernán Del Riego as Odilón
 Alejandro Tomassi as Malfavón Heredia
 Enrique Rocha as Ruán
 Jorge Russek as Don Rosendo Equigua
 Joana Brito as Vititos
 Evangelina Sosa as Young Magdalena
 Arcelia Ramírez as Ignacia Rentería
 Aarón Hernán as Felipe Tóvar
 Socorro Bonilla as Inmaculada
 Martha Aura as Mercedes
 Manuel Guízar as Eduardo Rentería
 Mario Iván Martínez as Señor Onchi
 Fernando Torre Laphame as Señor Obispo
 Susana Zabaleta as Medarda Zavala
 José María Yazpik as Young Batán
 Zaide Silvia Gutiérrez as Olinca
 Víctor González as Young Gumaro Amezcua
 Ana de la Reguera as Priscila
 Adriana Fonseca as Jovita
 Marisol del Olmo as Leocadia
 Kuno Becker as Hermilio Jaimez
 Adriana Lavat as Dora Luz
 Alec Von Bargen as Malfavón

Awards and nominations

Commentary
Inspired by the true story of Leonarda Ruán, aunt of the writer Javier Ruán.
The role of "La Beltraneja" was originally for Lucía Méndez, but she moved to TV Azteca.

References

External links

1997 telenovelas
Mexican telenovelas
1997 Mexican television series debuts
1997 Mexican television series endings
Spanish-language telenovelas
Television shows set in Veracruz
Televisa telenovelas